MethBase is a database of DNA methylation data derived from next-generation sequencing data. MethBase provides a visualization of publicly available bisulfite sequencing and reduced representation bisulfite sequencing experiments through the UCSC Genome Browser.  MethBase contents include single-CpG site resolution methylation levels for each CpG site in the genome of interest, annotation of regions of hypomethylation often associated with gene promoters, and annotation of allele-specific methylation associated with genomic imprinting.

See also
 DNA methylation
 MethDB
 NGSmethDB

References

External links
 http://smithlabresearch.org/software/methbase

Genetics databases
Epigenetics
DNA
DNA sequencing